Eyes absent homolog 4 is a protein that in humans is encoded by the EYA4 gene.

This gene encodes a member of the eyes absent (EYA) subfamily of proteins. The encoded protein may act as a transcriptional activator and be important for continued function of the mature organ of Corti. Mutations in this gene are associated with postlingual, progressive, autosomal dominant hearing loss at the deafness, autosomal dominant nonsyndromic sensorineural 10 locus. Three transcript variants encoding distinct isoforms have been identified for this gene.

References

Further reading